Ryūsei-ha (龍生派) is a Japanese school of ikebana.

References

External links 

 Official homepage

Kadō schools